Hranovnica is a village and municipality in Poprad District in the Prešov Region of northern Slovakia. Also it’s second  biggest village by population in the district

History
In historical records the village was first mentioned in 1294.

Geography 
The municipality lies at an altitude of 613 metres and covers an area of 32.662 km². It has a population of about 3 204 people.

Infrastructure and economy
Hranovnica is one of the startpoints to Slovenský raj mountain area. The village has a good tourist infrastructure. Cultural sightseeings are Roman Catholic and evangelical churches, both built or reconstructed in classical style.

Genealogical resources

The records for genealogical research are available at the state archive "Statny Archiv in Levoca, Slovakia"

 Roman Catholic church records (births/marriages/deaths): 1820-1905 (parish A)
 Lutheran church records (births/marriages/deaths): 1788-1910 (parish B)

See also
 List of municipalities and towns in Slovakia

References

External links

http://www.hranovnica.sk
https://web.archive.org/web/20160804012106/http://hranovnica.e-obce.sk/
http://www.slovenskyraj.sk/obce/hranovnica/hranovnica.html
Surnames of living people in Hranovnica

Villages and municipalities in Poprad District